London Summit may refer to:

Meeting and conferences
 2009 G-20 London Summit
 1977 London summit or 4th NATO summitt
 17th G7 summit, or 1991 G7 London summit
 10th G7 summit, or 1984 G7 London summit
 3rd G7 summit, or 1977 G7 London summit
 London Conference of 1913

Geographic peaks
 the summit of Mount London
 the summit of London Mountain
 the summit of London Peak, see List of mountains in Madison County, Montana